Voxel Bridge is an interactive public artwork under the Cambie Bridge in Vancouver, by artist Jessica Angel. The  mural is a vinyl overlay on the bridge that reveals interactive elements through augmented reality (AR), with aspects of the artwork being sold as non-fungible tokens. The installation  will be part of the Vancouver Biennale from summer 2021 to 2023.

Description 
The Voxel Bridge project is part of the Vancouver Biennale. The object is located on the lower tier of the Cambie Bridge, the first wooden version of which was built in 1891. The word “voxel” means a point in a three-dimensional space. Voxel Bridge exists both as a tangible analogue work of art and an online digital one. The author of the public art installation is Colombian artist Jessica Angel. She created this installation at the suggestion of Barrie Mowatt, the Artistic Director and Founder of the Vancouver Biennale.

The organizers of the Biennale announce that Voxel Bridge will become the largest installation in the field of digital public art. According to the COO, "nothing has been done at this scale outdoors that's fully interactive".

The physical part of the installation is a vinyl overlay mounted directly on the surface of the bridge: on the lower part of its flooring, around the columns, as well as on the sidewalk, under the feet of passers-by. This vinyl surface is visible to the naked eye and looks like a custom circuit board. Even without the involvement of augmented reality, the impression of three-dimensional internal elements of the computer is created. On the vinyl layer on the ground, markers will be located, somewhat similar to QR codes. The markers are designed to be read using a smartphone scanner.

Users will need to download a dedicated application to access the Voxel Bridge digital layer. This application will have a scanner that is required to read the markers. By moving the phone, users will see digital objects around them. It is announced that these objects will be movable, animated and interactive: they could be "touched" through a smartphone.

The installation of the vinyl cover began on June 7, 2021. The development of the entire project took about three years and more than $300,000, far exceeding the planned budget. Therefore, the animations presented are supposed to be sold to recover the costs. The opening of the art object is scheduled at noon on August 12, 2021. The installation will be supported until 2023.

The project will feature 20 different interactive animations, which also display the history of the Kusama network and how it was created, funded, and governed. Each of animation correspond to its own NFT - a non-fungible token in a blockchain technology system.

The Vancouver Biennale app, through which users can interact with augmented reality, will be available for free download on Mac and Android devices. Jessica Angel has been working on the online element in partnership with the Spheroid Universe, which powers blockchain technology on the Kusama Network.

Meaning 
The organizers of the forum call the Voxel Bridge project "a milestone event in Contemporary Art", explaining:

See also 
Public art in Vancouver

References

External sources 
 Voxel Bridge on Vancouver Biennale official page

Augmented reality applications
Blockchain art
Public art in Vancouver